Victor Bădulescu (July 28, 1892–December 1953 or January 1954) was a Romanian economist.

Born in Găești, Bădulescu was undersecretary of the Ministry of Finance of Romania from February 7, 1935 to August 29, 1936, when he was appointed secretary general of the Ministry of Foreign Affairs.

In 1945 he was elected corresponding member of the Romanian Academy, but was expelled in 1948 after the onset of Communist rule. After being arrested by the Communist authorities, he died in Sighet Prison in December 1953 or January 1954.

See also
 List of purged members of the Romanian Academy

References
 
 

1892 births
1954 deaths
People from Găești
20th-century Romanian economists
Corresponding members of the Romanian Academy
Inmates of Sighet prison
Members of the Romanian Academy of Sciences
Prisoners who died in Romanian detention
Romanian people who died in prison custody
Prisoners who died in Securitate custody